"So Close" is a song by Swedish production duo NOTD and German record producer Felix Jaehn featuring American production team Captain Cuts and vocals by English singer Georgia Ku, released as a single on 2 November 2018. It reached the top 50 in Australia, New Zealand and Germany before reaching number one on both the US Billboard Dance Club Songs and Dance/Mix Show Airplay charts in its 2 March 2019 issue.

It gained further attention for its music video starring Sports Illustrated Swimsuit cover girl Camille Kostek.

Music video
The first music video, released in December 2018, features a man and woman who meet on a work commute and fall in love.

A second music video, released in June 2019, features Sports Illustrated Swimsuit Issue cover girl Camille Kostek.

Charts

Weekly charts

Year-end charts

Certifications

See also
 List of number-one dance singles of 2019 (U.S.)
 List of number-one dance airplay hits of 2019 (U.S.)

References

2018 singles
2018 songs
NOTD songs
Felix Jaehn songs
Songs written by Ryan Rabin
Songs written by Ben Berger
Songs written by Ryan McMahon (record producer)
Song recordings produced by Captain Cuts